

Explanation of List

League appearances
League appearances and goals should include data for the following league spells, but should not include test or play-off matches:
 Southern League: 1898–99 to 1914–15
 Football League: 1919–20 to 1992–93, 2003–04 to 2004–05, 2011–12
 Premier League: 1993–94 to 2002–03, 2005–06 to 2010–11, 2012–13 to present

European appearances
European appearances and goals should include the data for the following campaigns:
 UEFA Cup Winners' Cup 1964–65, 1965–66, 1975–76, 1980–81
 UEFA Intertoto Cup 1999
 UEFA Cup/Europa League 1999–2000, 2006–07, 2015–16, 2016–17, 2021–22
 UEFA Europa Conference League 2022–23

Other appearances
The figures for other appearances should include the following competitions:
 Southern League test matches 1898–99 and 1899–1900
 Southern Professional Floodlit Cup 1955–56 to 1959–60
 Charity Shield 1964, 1975, 1980
 Watney Cup 1973–74
 Texaco Cup 1974–75
 Anglo-Italian League Cup 1975–76
 Full Members Cup 1986–87 to 1991–92
 Anglo-Italian Cup 1992–93
 Football League play-offs 2003–04, 2004–05, 2011–12

List of players
 Minimum of 100 club appearances to be included 
 Bold indicates player is still with West Ham United
 Correct as of match played 12 March 2023, vs Aston Villa

West Ham United's England Internationals

To date, there have been forty-four players represent the senior England team whilst playing for West Ham United.
 Bold indicates player is still with West Ham United
 Correct as of match played 10 December 2022, vs

Club captains

References
Full appearance data by player and by match at westhamstats.info

 
West Ham
Association football player non-biographical articles